Thirkleby is a hamlet in the civil parish of Kirby Grindalythe, Ryedale, North Yorkshire, England. Roger of Thirkleby (died 1260), a judge and Chief Justice of the Common Pleas, was named after this place.

Thirkleby Manor Farmhouse is a grade II listed building, being an 18th-century red-brick two-storey building altered in the early and middle 19th century. The site of a medieval settlement is adjacent.

In 1870–72 the township of Thirkleby had a population of 50 people in 9 houses.

References

External links

Hamlets in North Yorkshire